The Valmet PIK-23 Towmaster or Suhinu is a Finnish two-seater glider-towing/primary trainer aircraft built entirely out of composite materials in the early 1980s.

Design and development
The Finnish technology students aviation club (PIK) suggested in the 1970s, that a new aircraft should be developed for glider towing. The work focused on the improvement of a previous design, the PIK-19 Muhinu. Later on, the Helsinki University of Technology and Valmet Oy joined the project and the design process started from scratch. The goal was to develop a target/glider tower, which also could be used for basic training. It was given the name "PIK-23 Towmaster".

Only two aircraft were manufactured, one at Valmet and one at the Helsinki University of Technology. The first aircraft, OH-TOW, made its maiden flight on March 22, 1982, flown by Mikko Järvi. The second aircraft, OH-TUG, flew the following year.

Valmet marketed the aircraft intensively, but no orders followed. It was also investigated if the aircraft could be sold in parts, for self-assembly, in order to lower the price. In its intended role as a glider tower, the PIK-23 has been quite successful.

Specifications (PIK-23)

See also

References

Notes

Bibliography
Taylor, John W.R. Jane's All The World's Aircraft 1982-83. London:Jane's Yearbooks, 1982. .

1980s Finnish civil utility aircraft
Low-wing aircraft
Glider tugs
PIK aircraft
Valmet aircraft
Single-engined tractor aircraft
Aircraft first flown in 1982